Karol is a Basque, Danish, Finnish, Norwegian, Polish, Slovak, Slovene, and Swedish masculine given name that is a form of Karl or Karolus. Notable people with the name include the following:

Given name 

 Karol Adamiecki (1866–1933), Polish economist, engineer and management researcher
Karol Adwentowicz (1871–1958), Polish actor and theater director
Karol Anders (1893–1971), Polish Army officer
Karol Angielski (born 1996), Polish footballer
Karol Antoniewicz (1807–1852), Polish Jesuit and missionary
Karol Bachura (born 1964), Polish diplomat
Karol Bačo (born 1978), Slovak water polo player
Karol Bahrke (1868–1935), Polish printer and publisher
Karol Baliński (1817–1864), Polish poet
Karol Becker (fl. 1990s), Czech sprint canoer 
Karol Berger (born 1947), American musicologist
Karol Bermúdez (born 2001), Uruguayan footballer
Karol Bielecki (born 1982), Polish handball player
Karol Biermann (born 1984), Slovak ice hockey player
 Karol J. Bobko (born 1937), an American astronaut
Karol Bohdanowicz (1867–1947), Polish mining engineer, geographer and geologist
Karol Olgierd Borchardt (1905–1986), Polish writer and Merchant Marine captain
Karol Borhy (1912–1997), Slovak football coach
Karol Borsuk (1905–1982), Polish mathematician
Karol Boscamp-Lasopolski (died 1794), Dutch diplomat
Karol Bučko (fl. 1951–1972), Slovak football coach
Karol-Ann Canuel (born 1988), Canadian racing cyclist,
Karol Cariola (born 1987), Chilean midwife
Karol Castillo (1989–2013), Peruvian model and beauty pageant titleholder
Karol Chmiel (1911–1951), Polish military officer
Karol Chodura (1921–2001), Polish cinematographer
Karol Csányi (born 1991), Slovak ice hockey player
Karol Danielak (born 1991), Polish footballer
Karol Dejna (1911–2004), Polish linguist
Karol Divín (born 1936), Hungarian figure skater
Karol Dobay (1928–1982), Slovak footballer
Karol Dobiaš (born 1947), Slovak football player and coach
Karol Domagalski (born 1989), Polish racing cyclist
Karol John Drewienkiewicz (fl. 1966–2001), British Army Major General
Karol Drzewiecki (born 1995), Polish tennis player
 Karl (Karol) Duldig (1902–1986), Austrian-Australian sculptor
Karol Durski-Trzaska (1849–1935), Austro-Hungarian and  Polish Army officer
 Karol d'Abancourt de Franqueville (soldier) (1811–1849), Polish soldier
 Karol d'Abancourt de Franqueville (lawyer) (1851–1913), Polish politician
Karol Estreicher (junior) (1906–1984), Polish historian of art, writer and bibliographer
Karol Estreicher (senior) (1827–1908), Polish historian, literary critic and bibliographer
Karol Fageros (1934–1988), American tennis player
Karol Fila (born 1998), Polish footballer
Karol Foltán (born 1959), Slovak ice dancer 
Karol Fryzowicz (born 1991), Polish footballer
Karol Galba (1921–2009), Slovak football official
 Karol Gregorek (born 1983), Polish footballer
Karol Grossmann (1864–1929), Slovenian film maker
Karol Gruszecki (born 1989), Polish basketball player
Karol Grycz-Śmiłowski (1885–1959), Polish Lutheran priest
Karol Gwóźdź (born 1987), Polish poet, musician, DJ, composer and music producer
Karol Hanke (1903–1964), Polish footballer
Karol Hiller (1891–1939), Polish artist
Karol Hławiczka (1894–1976), Polish composer, pianist, teacher and Chopinologist
Karol Hochberg (1911–1944), Hungarian Holocaust collaborator
Karol Hoffmann (born 1989), Polish triple jump athlete
Karol Hoffmann (born 1913), Polish triple jump and high jump athlete
Karol Boromeusz Hoffman (1798–1875), Polish political writer, historian, lawyer and publisher
Karol Hutten-Czapski (1860–1904), Polish philanthropist
Karol Ihring (born 1953), Slovak football referee
Karol Irzykowski (1873–1944), Polish writer, literary critic, film theoretician, and chess player
Karol Itauma (born 2000), Slovak boxer
Karol Jabłoński (born 1962) Polish sailor
Karol Jakubowicz (died 2013), Polish journalism and communication science academic
Karol Jokl (1945–1996), Slovak football player and manager
Karol Daniel Kadłubiec (born 1937), Polish ethnographer, folklorist and historian
Karol Karlík (born 1986), Slovak footballer
Karol Karski (born 1966), Polish politician
 Karol Kennedy (1932–2004), American figure skater
Karol Kisel (born 1977), Slovak footballer
Karol Kłos (born 1989), Polish volleyball player
Karol Kmetko (1875–1948), Slovak Roman Catholic Bishop
 Karol Kniaziewicz (1762–1842), Polish general and activist
Karol Korím (born 1993), Slovak ice hockey player
Karol Kossok (1907–1946), Polish footballer
Karol Kostrubała (born 1988), Polish footballer 
Karol Kot (1946–1968), Polish serial killer
Karol Kozun (born 1982), Polish Paralympian throwing athlete
Karol Križan (born 1980), Slovak ice hockey player
Karol Józef Krótki (1922–2007), Polish demographer 
 Karol Kučera (born 1974), Slovak tennis player
Karol Kulisz (1873–1940), Polish Lutheran pastor
Karol Kurpiński (1785–1857), Polish composer, conductor and pedagogue
Karol Kuryluk (1910–1967), Polish journalist, editor, activist, politician and diplomat
Karol Kuzmány (1806 –1866), Slovak Lutheran pastor, writer, and theologian
Karol Lanckoroński (1848–1933), Polish writer, art collector, and historian
Karol Gwido Langer (1894–1948), Polish army officer
Karol Langner (1843–1912), Polish priest
Karol Łazar (born 1976), Polish rower
Karol Libelt (1807–1875), Polish philosopher, writer, activist, social worker and politician
Karol Linetty (born 1995), Polish footballer
 Karol Lipinski (1790–1861), Polish violinist and composer
Karol Ignacy Lorinser (1796–1853), Austrian physician
Karol Lucero (born 1987), Chilean radio personality and television host
Karol Mackiewicz (born 1992), Polish footballer
Karol Madaj (born 1980), Polish board game designer
Karol Maleczyński (1897–1968), Polish historian
Karol Mannion, Gaelic footballer
 Karol Marcinkowski (1800–1846), a Polish physician and social activist
Karol Marko (born 1966), Slovak football manager and player
Karol Martesko-Fenster (born 1961), American innovator and entrepreneur
Karol Mason, American attorney, government appointee, and academic administrator
Karol Mets (born 1993), Estonian footballer
Karol Mészáros (born 1993), Slovak footballer
Karol Meyer, nickname of Karoline Mariechen Meyer (born 1968), Brazilian free-diver
Karol Mikloš (born 1972), Slovak recording artist
Karol Miklosz (1915–2003), Ukrainian footballer
Karol Mikrut (born 1992), Polish luger
Karol Mikuli (1821–1897), Polish pianist, composer, conductor and teacher
Karol Modzelewski (1937–2019), Polish historian, writer, politician and academic
Karol Mondek (born 1991), Slovak footballer
Karol Myśliwiec (born 1943), Polish egyptologist
Karol Niemczycki (born 1999), Polish footballer
Karol Niemira (1881–1965), Polish Roman Catholic priest
 Karol Olszewski (1846–1915), Polish chemist, mathematician and physicist
Karol Pavelka (born 1983), Slovak football
Karol Pawlica (1884–1970), Polish patriot
Karol Pecze (born 1946), Slovak football manager
Karol Piątek (born 1982), Polish footballer
Karol Piegza (1899–1988), Polish teacher, writer, folklorist, photographer, and painter
Karol Piltz (1903–1939), Polish chess master
Karol Pniak (1910–1980), Polish flying ace
Karol Podczaszyński (1790–1860), Polish architect
Karol Pollak (1859–1928), Polish electrotechnician, inventor and businessman
Karol Popiel (1887–1977), Polish politician 
Karol Marian Pospieszalski (1909–2007), Polish lawyer and historian
Karol Praženica (born 1970), Slovak football player and manager
Karol Dominik Przezdziecki (1782–1832), Polish count
 Karol Stanisław Radziwiłł (1669–1719), Polish nobleman
 Karol Stanisław Radziwiłł (1734–1790) a Polish prince
Karol Radziwonowicz (born 1958), Polish pianist
Karol Rathaus (1895–1954) was an Austro-Hungarian Jewish composer
Karol Robak (born 1997), Polish taekwondo athlete
Karol Rómmel (1888–1967), Polish military officer, sportsman and horse rider
Karol G. Ross (born 1952), American scientist
Karol Hubert Rostworowski (1877–1938), Polish playwright, poet and musician
Karol Rotner, Israeli footballer
Karol Rovelto (born 1969), American high jumper
Karol Rusznyák (born 1967), Slovak ice hockey player
 Karol Rzepecki (1865–1931), Polish bookseller, editor, and activist 
Karol Sabath (1963–2007), Polish biologist, paleontologist and paleoartist
Karol Sakr (born 1969), Lebanese singer
Karol Schayer (1900–1971), Polish architect and soldier
Karol Semik (born 1953), Polish educator
 Karol Sevilla, professional name of Karol Itzitery Piña Cisneros (born 1999), Mexican singer and actress
Karol Sidon (born 1942), Czech rabbi, writer and playwright
Karol Sidor (1901–1953), Slovak nationalist politician
Karol Sikora (born 1948), British oncology physician
Karol Skórkowski (1768–1851), Polish bishop
Karol Skowerski (born 1984), Polish pool player
Karol Śliwka (1894–1943), Polish politician
Karol Sloboda (born 1983), Slovak ice hockey player
Karol Šmidke (1897–1952), Slovak politician
Karol Herman Stępień (1910–1943), Polish Roman Catholic martyr
Karol Stopa (born 1948) Polish sports journalist, commentator and tennis player
Karol Stricker (1959–2008), American painter
Karol Stryja (1915–1998), Polish conductor and teacher
Karol Stuchlák (born 1990), Slovak luger
Karol Świderski (born 1997), Polish footballer 
 Karol Świerczewski (1897–1947), Polish Soviet military officer and general
Karol Świtalski (1902–1993), Polish Lutheran priest and military chaplain
Karol Juliusz Sym, known as Igo Sym (1896–1941), Polish actor
Karol Szajnocha (1818–1868), Polish writer, historian, and activist
Karol Szenajch (1907–2001), Polish ice hockey player
Karol Szreter (1898–1933), Polish classical pianist
Karol Szwedowski (1889–1941), Polish builder
 Karol Szymanowski (1882–1937), Polish pianist and composer
Karol Szymański (born 1993), Polish footballer
Karol Tarło (1639–1702), Polish politician
Karol Tchorek (1904–1985), Polish sculptor, art dealer and collector
Karol Telbizov (1915–1994), Bulgarian lawyer, journalist and editor
Karol Točík (1890–1960), Slovak Roman Catholic priest, dean, and historian
Karol Chester Tollstam, known as Chet Tollstam (1918–2003), American basketball player
Karol Turno (1788–1860), Polish Brigadier General
Karol Ferdynand Vasa (1613–1655), Polish noblemansza
Karol Wedel (1813–1902), German confectioner
Karol Wight, American museum administrator
 Karol D. Witkowski (1860–1910), a Polish artist
Karol Wolfram (1899–1965), Polish Evangelical priest and professor
Karol Józef Wojtyła, birth name of Pope John Paul II (1920–2005), Polish head of the Catholic Church and sovereign of the Vatican City State
Karol Fryderyk Woyda (1771–1845), Polish politician
Karol Ząbik (born 1986), Polish speedway rider 
Karol Zachar (1918–2003), Slovak director, actor, art director, costume designer and pedagogue
Karol Zając (1913–1965), Polish alpine skier
Karol Zalewski (born 1993), Polish sprint athlete
Karol Zaremba (1846–1897), Polish architect
Karol Wiktor Zawodziński, who used the pseudonym Karol de Johne (1890–1949), Polish literary critic, theoretist and historian of literature
Karol Ziemski (1895–1974), Polish Army general
Karol Zine, Indian television actress
Karol Żurek (born 1949), Polish ice hockey player
Karol Życzkowski (born 1960), Polish physicist and mathematician

Nickname
Karol Conká, birth name Karoline dos Santos Oliveira (born 1987), Brazilian entertainer
Karol G, stage name of Carolina Giraldo Navarro (born 1991), Colombian singer and songwriter
Tina Karol, stage name of Tetyana Hryhorivna Liberman (born 1985), Ukrainian singer

Middle name 

Józef Karol Konrad Chełmicki (born 1814–1890), Polish military officer
 Jan Karol Chodkiewicz (c. 1561–1621), Lithuanian military commander 
 Adam Karol Czartoryski, Spanish aristocrat
Jan Karol Czolański (died 1664), Ukrainian Roman Catholic prelate
Jan Karol Dolski (1637–1695), Polish nobleman
Jozef Karol Hell, known by his Hungarian name József Károly Hell (1713–1789), Hungarian mining engineer and inventor
Juliusz Karol Kunitzer (1843–1905), Polish industrialist, activist, and philanthropist
Jerzy Karol Kurnatowski (1874–1934), Polish lawyer, economist, academic, author, politician, public official, and political scientist
 Józef Karol Lubomirski (1638–1702), a Polish nobleman
Jan Karol Opaliński (1642–1695), Polish starost and kasztelan
Zygmunt Karol Radziwiłł (1591–1642), Polish-Lithuanian noble
 Jan Karol Tarło (c. 1593–1645), Polish noble

Surname 
 Davida Karol (1917–2011), Israeli actress
Dušan Karol (born 1983), Czech tennis player
Erik Karol (born 1963), French singer, author and composer
Sanjay Karol (born 1961), Indian judge
Tina Karol (born 1985), Ukrainian singer, songwriter actress and TV presenter
Yuliya Karol (born 1991), Belarusian middle-distance athlete

See also

Carol (given name)
Karel (given name)
Karl (given name)
Karlo (name)
Karo (name)
Karola
Karole
Karoli (name)
Karolj
Károly
Karon (name)
Karyl

Notes

Basque masculine given names
Danish masculine given names
Finnish masculine given names
Norwegian masculine given names
Polish masculine given names
Slovak masculine given names
Slovene masculine given names
Swedish masculine given names